Jean Baptiste Point du Sable (also spelled Point de Sable, Point au Sable, Point Sable, Pointe DuSable, Pointe du Sable; before 1750 – August 28, 1818) is regarded as the first permanent non-Indigenous settler of what would later become Chicago, Illinois, and is recognized as the "Founder of Chicago". A school, museum, harbor, park, bridge, road, have been named in his honor. The site where he settled near the mouth of the Chicago River around the 1780s is identified as a National Historic Landmark, now located in Pioneer Court.

Point du Sable was of African descent, but little else is known of his early life prior to the 1770s. During his career, the areas where he settled and traded around the Great Lakes and in the Illinois Country changed hands several times between France, Britain, Spain and the United States. Described as handsome and well educated, Point duSable married a Native American woman, Kitiwaha, and they had two children. In 1779, during the American Revolutionary War, he was arrested by the British on suspicion of being an American Patriot sympathizer. In the early 1780s he worked for the British lieutenant-governor of Michilimackinac on an estate at what is now St. Clair, Michigan.

Point du Sable is first recorded as living at the mouth of the Chicago River in a trader's journal of early 1790.  By then he had established an extensive and prosperous trading settlement in what later became the City of Chicago. He sold his Chicago River property in 1800 and moved to the port of St. Charles, where he was licensed to run a ferry across the Missouri River. Point duSable's successful role in developing the Chicago River settlement was little recognized until the mid-20th century.

Biography

There are no records of Point du Sable's life prior to the 1770s. Though it is known from sources during his life that he was of African descent, his birth date, place of birth, and parents are unknown. Juliette Kinzie, another early pioneer of Chicago, never met Point duSable but said in her 1856 memoir that he was "a native of St.Domingo" (the island of Hispaniola). This became generally accepted as his place of birth. Historian Milo Milton Quaife regarded Kinzie's account of Point duSable as "largely fictitious and wholly unauthenticated", later putting forward a theory that he was of African and French-Canadian origin.   A historical novel published in 1953 helped to popularize the claim that Point du Sable was born in 1745 in Saint-Marc in Saint-Domingue (later known as Haiti). If he was born outside continental North America, there are competing accounts as to whether he entered as a trader from the north through French Canada, or from the south through French Louisiana. 

Point du Sable married a Potawatomi woman named Kitihawa (Christianized to Catherine) on 27October 1788, in a Catholic ceremony in Cahokia in the Illinois Country, a longtime French colonial settlement on the east side of the Mississippi River. It is likely that this couple was married earlier in the 1770s in a Native American tradition. They had a son named Jean and a daughter named Susanne.  Point duSable supported his family as a frontier trader and settler during a period of great upheaval for the former southern dependencies of French Canada and in the Illinois Country, where the regions changed hands several times over the course of half a century.

In a footnote to a poem titled Speech to the Western Indians, Arent DePeyster, British commandant from 1774 to 1779 at Fort Michilimackinac (a former French fort in what was then the British province of Quebec), noted that "Baptist Point deSaible" was "a handsome negro", "well educated", and "settled in Eschecagou". When he published this poem in 1813, DePeyster presented it as a speech that he had made at the village of Arbrecroche (now Harbor Springs, Michigan) on 4July 1779. This footnote has led many scholars to assume that Point duSable had settled in Chicago by 1779. But letters written by other traders in the late 1770s suggest that Point duSable was at this time settled at the mouth of Trail Creek (Rivière duChemin) at what is now Michigan City, Indiana.

In August 1779, during the American Revolutionary War, Point duSable was arrested as a suspected Patriot at Trail Creek by British troops and imprisoned briefly at Fort Michilimackinac.  An officer's report following his arrest noted that Point du Sable had many friends who vouched for his good character. The following year, Point du Sable was ordered transported to the Pinery on the St. Clair River north of Detroit. From the summer of 1780 until May 1784, Point duSable managed the Pinery, a tract of woodlands owned by British officer Lt.Patrick Sinclair, on the St. Clair River in eastern Michigan. This may have been a choice given by him from the British, offering him release from his imprisonment to manage the Pinery. Point duSable with his family lived in a cabin at the mouth of the Pine River in what is now the city of St. Clair.

At some time in the 1780s, after the US achieved independence, Point du Sable settled on the north bank of the Chicago River close to its mouth. The earliest known record of Point duSable living in Chicago is an entry that Hugh Heward made in his journal on 10May 1790, during a journey from Detroit across Michigan and through Illinois. Heward's party stopped at Point duSable's house enroute to the Chicago portage; they swapped their canoe for a pirogue that belonged to Point duSable, and they bought bread, flour, and pork from him. Perrish Grignon, who visited Chicago in about 1794, described Point duSable as a large man and wealthy trader. Point du Sable's granddaughter, Eulalie Pelletier, was born at his Chicago River settlement in 1796. 

In 1800 Point duSable sold his farm to John Kinzie's frontman, Jean La Lime, for 6,000 livres. The bill of sale, which was rediscovered in 1913 in an archive in Detroit, detailed all of the property Point duSable owned, as well as many of his personal effects. This included a house, two barns, a horse-drawn mill, a bakehouse, a poultry house, a dairy, and a smokehouse. The house was a  log cabin filled with fine furniture and paintings.

After Point du Sable sold his property in Chicago, he moved to St. Charles, west of St. Louis. It is now in Missouri but at that time still in Spanish Louisiana. He was commissioned by the colonial governor to operate a ferry across the Missouri River. In St.Charles, he may have lived for a time with his son, and later with his granddaughter's family. Late in life, he may have sought public or charitable assistance. He died on 28 August 1818, and was buried in an unmarked grave in St.Charles Borromeo Cemetery. His entry in the parish burial register does not mention his origins, parents, or relatives; it simply describes him as nègre (French for negro). 

The St.Charles Borromeo Cemetery was moved twice in the 19thcentury. Oral tradition and records of the Archdiocese of St. Louis suggested that Point duSable's remains were also moved. On 12October 1968, the Illinois Sesquicentennial Commission erected a granite marker at the site believed to be Point duSable's grave in the third St.Charles Borromeo Cemetery.

In 2002 an archaeological investigation of the grave site was initiated by the African Scientific Research Institute at the University of Illinois at Chicago. Researchers using a combination of ground-penetrating radar, surveys, and excavation of a  area did not find any evidence of any burials at the supposed grave site, leading the archaeologists to conclude that Point duSable's remains may not have been reinterred from one of the two previous cemeteries.

Theories and legends

Early life
Though there is little historical evidence regarding Point duSable's life before the 1770s, there are several theories and legends that give accounts of his early life. Writing in 1933, Quaife identified a French immigrant to Canada, Pierre Dandonneau, who acquired the title "Sieur deSable" and whose descendants were known by both the names Dandonneau and DuSable. Quaife was unable to find a direct link to Point duSable, but he identified descendants of Pierre Dandonneau as living around the Great Lakes region in Detroit, Mackinac, and St.Joseph. He speculated that Point duSable's father may have been a member of this family, while his mother was likely an enslaved woman.

In 1951 Joseph Jeremie, a native of Haiti, published a pamphlet in which he said he was the great grandson of Point duSable. Based on family recollections and tombstone inscriptions, he claimed that Point duSable was born in Saint-Marc in what was then Saint Domingue, studied in France, and returned to Haiti to deal in coffee before traveling to French Louisiana. Historian and Point duSable biographer John F. Swenson has called these claims "elaborate, undocumented assertions... in a fanciful biography".

Fiction
In 1953 Shirley Graham drew from the work of Quaife and Jeremie in a historical novel about Point duSable. She described it as "not accurate history nor pure fiction", but rather "an imaginative interpretation of all the known facts". This book presented Point duSable as the son of the mate on a pirate ship, the Black Sea Gull, and a freedwoman called Suzanne. Despite lack of evidence and the continued debate about Point duSable's early life, parentage, and birthplace, this popular story has been repeated and widely presented as being definitive.

Peoria
In 1815 a land claim that had been submitted by Nicholas Jarrot to the land commissioners at Kaskaskia, Illinois Territory, was approved. In the claim Jarrot asserted that a "Jean Baptiste Poinstable" had been "head of a family at Peoria in the year 1783, and before and after that year", and that he "had a house built and cultivated land between the Old Fort and the new settlement in the year 1780". This document has been taken by Quaife and other historians as evidence that Point duSable lived at Peoria on the Illinois River prior to going north to settle in Chicago.  Other records demonstrate that Point duSable was living and working under the British at the Pinery in Michigan in the early 1780s. The Kaskaskia land commissioners identified many fraudulent land claims, including two previously submitted in the name of Point duSable. Nicholas Jarrot, the claimant, was involved in many false claims, and Swenson suggests that this one was also fraudulent, made without the knowledge of Point duSable. Although perhaps in conflict with some of the above information, some historical records suggest that Point duSable bought land in Peoria from J.B. Maillet on 13March 1773, and sold it to Isaac Darneille in 1783 before he became the first "permanent" resident of Chicago.

Departure from Chicago
Point du Sable left Chicago in 1800. He sold his property to Jean La Lime, a trader from Quebec, and moved to the Missouri River valley, at that time part of Spanish Louisiana. The reason for his departure is unknown. By 1804, John Kinzie, who also settled in Chicago, had bought the former du Sable house. In her 1852 memoir, Juliette Kinzie, Kinzie's daughter-in-law, suggested that "perhaps he [du Sable] was disgusted at not being elected to a similar dignity [great chief] by the Pottowattamies".

In 1874 Nehemiah Matson elaborated on this story, claiming that Point duSable was a slave from Virginia who had moved with his master to Lexington, Kentucky, in 1790. According to Matson, Point duSable became a zealous Catholic to convince a Jesuit missionary to declare him chief of the local Native Americans, and left Chicago when the natives refused to accept him as their chief. Quaife dismisses both of these stories as being fictional.

In her 1953 novel, Graham suggests that Point du Sable left Chicago because he was angered by the United States government. It wanted him to buy the land on which he had lived and called his own for the previous two decades. The 1795 Treaty of Greenville, which ended the Northwest Indian War, and the subsequent westward migration of Native Americans away from the Chicago area might also have influenced his decision.

Legacy and honors

Founder of Chicago
The French came to the North American mid-continent region in the 17thcentury. Louis Jolliet and Jacques Marquette, during their 1673 Mississippi Valley expedition, though probably not the first Europeans to visit the area, are the first in the written record to have crossed the Chicago Portage and traveled along the Chicago River. Over the following years visits continued, and occasional intermittent posts were established, including those by René LaSalle, Henri Tonti, Pierre Liette and the four-year Mission of the Guardian Angel. Point duSable 1780s establishment is recognized as the first settlement that continued on and ultimately grew to become the city of Chicago. He is therefore widely regarded as the first permanent resident of Chicago and has been given the appellation "Founder of Chicago".

Memorials

By the 1850s, historians of Chicago recognized Point duSable as the city's earliest non-native permanent resident. For a long time the city did not honor him in the same manner as other pioneers. Point du Sable was generally forgotten in the 19thcentury and instead the Scots-Irish trader John Kinzie, who had bought his property, was often credited for the settlement. A plaque was erected by the city in 1913 at the corner of Kinzie and Pine Streets to commemorate the Kinzie homestead. In the planning stages of the 1933–1934 Century of Progress International Exposition, several African-American groups campaigned for Point duSable to be honored at the fair. At the time, few Chicagoans had even heard of Point duSable, and the fair's organizers presented the 1803 construction of Fort Dearborn as the city's historical beginning. The campaign was successful, and a replica of Point duSable's cabin was presented as part of the "background of the history of Chicago".

In 1965 a plaza called Pioneer Court was built on the site of Point duSable's homestead as part of the construction of the Equitable Life Assurance Society of America building. The Jean Baptiste Point Du Sable Homesite was designated as a National Historic Landmark on May 11, 1976, as a site deemed to have "exceptional value to the nation". Pioneer Court is located at what is now 401N.Michigan Avenue in the Michigan–Wacker Historic District. At this site in 2009 the City of Chicago and a private donor, Haitian-born, Lesly Benodin, erected a large bronze bust of Point duSable by Chicago-born sculptor Erik Blome. In October 2010 the Michigan Avenue Bridge was renamed DuSable Bridge in honor of Point duSable. Previously, a small street named DeSaible Street had been named after him. In 2021, Lake Shore Drive in Chicago was renamed in Point du Sable's honor.

Several institutions have been named in honor of Point duSable. DuSable High School opened in Bronzeville, Chicago in 1934. The DuSable campus today houses the Daniel Hale Williams Prep School of Medicine, and the Bronzeville Scholastic Institute.
Margaret Taylor-Burroughs, a prominent African-American artist and writer, taught at the school for twenty-three years. She and her husband co-founded the DuSable Museum of African American History, located on Chicago's South Side, which was renamed in honor of Point duSable in 1968. DuSable Harbor is located in the heart of downtown Chicago at the foot of Randolph Street, and DuSable Park is a  urban park in Chicago currently awaiting redevelopment. The project was originally announced in 1987 by Mayor Harold Washington. A park is also named after du Sable in St Charles, his other notable place of residence.  The US Postal Service has also honored Point duSable with the issue of a Black Heritage Series 22-cent postage stamp on February 20 1987.

See also
 History of Chicago
 List of African-American firsts
 Antoine Ouilmette

Notes and references

Notes

References

References cited

External links

 DuSable Heritage Association
 
 The story of his life is retold in the radio drama "The Man Who Owned Chicago", a presentation from Destination Freedom

1818 deaths
People of New France
Year of birth unknown
People from Chicago
People of African descent
Haitian-American history
American city founders
1740s births
African-American Catholics
African-American history in Chicago